Jamie Patrick Bowden (born 9 July 2001) is an Irish professional footballer who plays as a midfielder for Tottenham Hotspur.

Career
Bowden joined the Tottenham academy at the age of six. In August 2021, Bowden was loaned out to Oldham Athletic. He was put straight into the squad in Oldham's first League Two game making his debut against Newport County.  Bowden returned to Tottenham in January of 2022.

Personal life
Bowden was born at North Middlesex Hospital in Edmonton, London and brought up in Tottenham. He attended the Holy Family Catholic School in Walthamstow. He has a brother Jake Bowden , who currently attends the school. In the 2021/22 season, he was loaned to fourth-division team Oldham Athletic.

Career statistics

References

External links
Soccerway

2001 births
Living people
Footballers from Edmonton, London
English footballers
Association football midfielders
Tottenham Hotspur F.C. players
Oldham Athletic A.F.C. players
English Football League players
Republic of Ireland youth international footballers